City Nights by Nick Gilder was released in 1978 on Chrysalis Records.

Track listing 
All tracks composed by Nick Gilder and James McCulloch
 "Got to Get Out"
 "We'll Work It Out"
 "(She's) One of the Boys"
 "All Because of Love"
 "Hot Child in the City"
 "Frustration"
 "Here Comes the Night"
 "21st Century"
 "Fly High"
 "Rockaway"

Personnel 
Nick Gilder - vocals
James Herndon - guitar, synthesizer, vocals
Craig Krampf - drums, percussion, vocals
Eric Nelson - bass, keyboards, vocals
James McCulloch - guitar

Charts

References

Nick Gilder albums
1978 albums
Albums produced by Mike Chapman
Chrysalis Records albums